Kabuga is a town in the Gasabo and Kicukiro districts, Kigali City, Rwanda.

It is home to a Divine Mercy Shrine, where the African offshoot of the World Apostolic Congress on Mercy was held in 2016.

References 

Populated places in Rwanda
Gasabo District
Kigali Province